Ti-Jean Petro is a snake-loa and son of Dan Petro in Haitian Vodou.

Haitian Vodou gods